La clemenza di Tito is a 1734 opera by Antonio Caldara, the original setting of the libretto by Metastasio.

Synopsis

References

Operas
1734 operas
Operas by Antonio Caldara
Italian-language operas
Cultural depictions of Titus